This is a list of seasons played by Iraklis Thessaloniki Football Club in Greek and European football, from 1959 to the present day. It details the club's achievements in major competitions, and the top scorers for each season.

Key

Key to league:
 Pos. = Final position
 Pl. = Played
 W = Games won
 D = Games drawn
 L = Games lost
 GF = Goals scored
 GA = Goals against
 Pts = Points

Key to rounds:
 W = Winners
 F = Final (Runner-up)
 SF = Semi-finals
 QF = Quarter-finals
 R16/R32 = Round of 16, round of 32, etc.
 PO = Play-off round
 FR = Fourth Round
 3rTh	 = 3rd round thessaloniki's
 GS = Group stage
 AR = Additional Round

Seasons

References

 
Greek football club seasons